The following is a list of the 272 communes of the Indre-et-Loire department of France.

The communes cooperate in the following intercommunalities (as of 2020):
Tours Métropole Val de Loire
Communauté de communes de Bléré Val de Cher
Communauté de communes du Castelrenaudais
Communauté de communes Chinon, Vienne et Loire
Communauté de communes de Gâtine et Choisilles - Pays de Racan
Communauté de communes Loches Sud Touraine
Communauté de communes Touraine-Est Vallées
Communauté de communes Touraine Ouest Val de Loire
Communauté de communes Touraine Val de Vienne
Communauté de communes Touraine Vallée de l'Indre
Communauté de communes du Val d'Amboise

References

Indre-et-Loire